I Live Alone, also known as Home Alone, is a South Korean entertainment program distributed and syndicated by MBC every Friday at 23:00 (KST).

Content
I Live Alone is recognized as one of the "Real-Variety" shows in Korean television. The program is unscripted using documentary techniques with variety show elements, which follows the format of other reality television programs such as Infinite Challenge, which airs on the same network.
Every Friday night, this program plays footage from selected Rainbow Club members' everyday lives, both in and out of their homes. As proclaimed on its homepage, there are about 5 million singles in South Korea and about one-third of South Korean entertainers are not in a relationship. This program shows viewers how single celebrities live, and has attained great popularity due to the relatability of the single lifestyles of various celebrities, which are shown without significant filtering.
Since its inception, each host of the program has gathered other celebrity guests to form a club called the Rainbow Club.

Philanthropy 
On December 23, 2022, I Live Alone donated all proceeds from calendar sales through the Beautiful Foundation.

Current members

Former members

Guests (with segments)

Appearances

Ratings

In the ratings below, the highest rating for the show will be in red, and the lowest rating for the show will be in blue each year.

2013

2014

2015

2016

2017

2018

2019

2020

2021

2022

2023

Notes

Awards and nominations

References

External links
  
  on MBC Global Media

2020s South Korean television series
2013 South Korean television series debuts
Korean-language television shows
MBC TV original programming
South Korean variety television shows
South Korean reality television series